Northwest Territory is a 1951 American Northern film directed by Frank McDonald and starring Kirby Grant, Gloria Saunders and Warren Douglas. The film is the fifth in the series of ten films featuring Kirby Grant as a Canadian Mountie.

Plot

Cast
 Kirby Grant as Corporal Rod Webb 
 Gloria Saunders as Anne DuMere 
 Warren Douglas as Dan Morgan 
 Pat Mitchell as Billy Kellogg
 Tristram Coffin as Kincaid 
 John Crawford as LeBeau 
 Duke York as Dawson 
 Don C. Harvey as Barton  
 Sam Flint as Pop Kellogg
 Chinook as Chinook, Webb's dog

See also
 Trail of the Yukon (1949)
 The Wolf Hunters (1949)
 Snow Dog (1950)
 Call of the Klondike (1950)
 Yukon Manhunt (1951)
 Yukon Gold (1952)
 Fangs of the Arctic (1953)
 Northern Patrol (1953)
 Yukon Vengeance (1954)

References

Bibliography
 Drew, Bernard. Motion Picture Series and Sequels: A Reference Guide. Routledge, 2013.

External links
 

1951 films
1951 Western (genre) films
American Western (genre) films
American black-and-white films
Corporal Rod Webb (film series)
1950s English-language films
Films based on American novels
Films based on works by James Oliver Curwood
Films directed by Frank McDonald
Films produced by Lindsley Parsons
Monogram Pictures films
Northern (genre) films
Royal Canadian Mounted Police in fiction
1950s American films